Tudivasum zanzibaricum, common name the Zanzibar tudicula, is a species of large sea snail, a marine gastropod mollusc in the subfamily Vasinae, the vase shells, within the family Turbinellidae.

Description
The shell can reach a length of 40 mm.

Distribution
This species occurs in the Indian Ocean off Zanzibar.

References

 Harasewych, M.G. (1997). The life and malacological contributions of R. Tucker Abbott (1919–1995). The Nautilus 110 (2): 55–77

External links
 

Turbinellidae
Gastropods described in 1958
Taxa named by Robert Tucker Abbott